The Cedarock Historical Farm, located at Cedarock Park in Alamance County, North Carolina, provides an example of life on a farm in North Carolina during the 19th Century.  Populated with farm animals, antique and replica farm equipment, and a farmhouse, the Historical Farm provides a fun, education stop while visiting Cedarock Park.

The historic district encompasses nine contributing buildings, one contributing site, and one contributing structure. They include the Greek Revival style G. W. Garrett House (c. 1835) with its full complement of farm outbuildings including a log kitchen; the Greek Revival style Curtis House (c. 1820); a 12-foot-high rock dam which may date to the early 19th century; the ruins of the rock foundation of the Huffman Mill, a water-powered grist mill (c. 1880) constructed on the
site of a brick antebellum cotton mill; and the Carney Post Office (c. 1893), a small one-story frame building.

It was added to the National Register of Historic Places in 1986.

References

External links
 Cedarock Historic Farm

Museums in Alamance County, North Carolina
Farm museums in North Carolina
Farms on the National Register of Historic Places in North Carolina
Greek Revival houses in North Carolina
Buildings and structures completed in 1820
History museums in North Carolina
National Register of Historic Places in Alamance County, North Carolina
Historic districts on the National Register of Historic Places in North Carolina